Joseph Gauthier (March 11, 1842 – September 26, 1911) was a farmer, grain merchant and political figure in Quebec. He represented L'Assomption in the House of Commons of Canada from 1887 to 1892 and from 1896 to 1900 as a Liberal.

He was born in Saint-Lin, Canada East, the son of Louis Gauthier and Aline Renaud. In 1865, Gauthier married Philomène Daunais. He served as mayor of Saint-Lin from 1872 to 1880. He ran unsuccessfully for a seat in the House of Commons in 1882. He was first elected in 1887; that election was appealed but he won the by-election which followed in 1888. His election in 1891 was declared void in 1892 and Hormidas Jeannotte was elected by acclamation in the by-election that followed. Gauthier defeated Jeannotte in the 1896 federal election. He died in Saint-Lin at the age of 69.

External Links 

By-election: On Mr. Gauthier being unseated, 3 March 1888

References 

Members of the House of Commons of Canada from Quebec
Liberal Party of Canada MPs
1842 births
1911 deaths
Mayors of places in Quebec